Teraburst is a classic 'shoot-em-up' arcade game made by Konami in 1998.

Description
The game is set in 2017. An invasion of UFOs has appeared and started to invade Earth. You are charged to blast the aliens back into outer space with a hand-held, recoiling machine gun, homing missiles and Napalm bombs. The game progresses through four stages of aliens.

References

1998 video games
Arcade video games
Arcade-only video games
Konami games
Konami arcade games
Shoot 'em ups
Video games developed in Japan